Ikke Pe Ikka is a 1994 Indian Hindi action film directed by Raj N. Sippy. It stars Akshay Kumar, Shantipriya, Moushumi Chatterjee, Anupam Kher and Chandni in lead roles.

Plot
Three brothers announce their engagement to three sisters, but their father believes that all six are too irresponsible to get married, and subsequently proposes to the girls' mother in order to sabotage their plans.

Cast
 Akshay Kumar as Rajiv
 Shantipriya as Komal
 Chandni as Kavita
 Pankaj Dheer as Randhir
 Moushumi Chatterjee as Kaushalya 
 Prithvi as Prithvi
 Anupam Kher as Kailashnath
 Shafi Inamdar as Iqbal 
 Tiku Talsania as Dr. Topiwala
 Guddi Maruti as Guddi
 Sudhir as Police Inspector

Soundtracks

References

External links
 

1994 films
1990s Hindi-language films
Films directed by Raj N. Sippy
Indian action films